Buranda was a Legislative Assembly electorate in the state of Queensland, Australia.

History
Buranda was created by the 1910 Electoral Districts Act, taking effect at the 1912 elections. It consisted broadly of the south-west corner of the former Electoral district of Bulimba. It was located south-east of Brisbane. It was abolished in the 1959 redistribution (taking effect at the 1960 elections), being incorporated into the newly created Electoral district of Greenslopes.

Members

The following people were elected in the seat of Buranda:

Election results

See also
 Electoral districts of Queensland
 Members of the Queensland Legislative Assembly by year
 :Category:Members of the Queensland Legislative Assembly by name

References

Former electoral districts of Queensland
1912 establishments in Australia
1960 disestablishments in Australia
Constituencies established in 1912
Constituencies disestablished in 1960